The 2016 Ohio Valley Conference men's basketball tournament was held March 2–5 at Nashville Municipal Auditorium in Nashville, Tennessee. Austin Peay, the #8 seed, won the tournament and earned the conference's automatic bid to the NCAA tournament. Due to the locale of the tournament, it was dubbed as Music City Madness.

Seeds
Only the top eight teams in the conference qualified for the Tournament. The #1 and #2 seeds received double byes to the semifinals under the merit-based format. The #3 and #4 seeds received a single bye to the quarterfinals. The #1 and #2 seeds went to the division champions.

Teams were seeded by record within the division and conference, with a tiebreaker system to seed teams with identical conference records.

Schedule

Bracket

See also
2016 Ohio Valley Conference women's basketball tournament

References

External links
2016 OVC Men's & Women's Basketball Championship

Ohio Valley Conference men's basketball tournament
Basketball competitions in Nashville, Tennessee
Tournament
Ohio Valley Conference men's basketball tournament
Ohio Valley Conference men's basketball tournament
College sports tournaments in Tennessee